Filippo Neri (born 4 December 2002) is an Italian professional footballer who plays as a goalkeeper for  side Venezia.

Career
On 26 August 2021 he signed a three-year contract for Venezia. On 30 August 2022, Neri was loaned to Feralpisalò. The loan to Feralpisalò was terminated on 19 January 2023.

Club statistics

Club

Notes

References

2002 births
Sportspeople from Pisa
Footballers from Tuscany
Living people
Italian footballers
Association football goalkeepers
U.S. Livorno 1915 players
Venezia F.C. players
FeralpiSalò players
Serie B players
Serie C players